Unique Photo is a camera, video, and audio superstore, and education center, with locations in Fairfield, NJ and Philadelphia, PA. It is a family owned business dating back to 1947. and now carries over 20,000 products.

History

The company started when Bernard and Harriet Sweetwood opened a small photographic supply outlet in Brooklyn in 1947. Soon after, they opened over 20 retail outlets in department stores across New Jersey and then the Hoboken Camera Center in the 1950s. In the 1980s, their two sons Jonathan and Matthew Sweetwood took over daily operations. On February 13, 2008, Unique Photo announced that their Florham Park, New Jersey location on Vreeland Road would be moving 8 miles away to the Fairfield, NJ superstore on Route 46 that exists today. The Fairfield, NJ superstore opened for business on February 18, 2008. Alexander Sweetwood is the third generation to join the company after graduating with an MBA from Montclair State University.  In October 2015, Alexander Sweetwood was named President of Unique Photo.
In 2019, Unique Photo opened up their second store location in Old City Philadelphia complete with classrooms and studio rental space.

Operation

Unique Photo runs both an online operation and an in-store operation. Their Fairfield, NJ superstore is a 50,000 square foot facility equipped with a multimedia classroom, a large rental equipment program, camera trade-in program, and a well-known professional photo lab. The facility also has a coffee bar, WiFi lounge, and meeting space. Unique Photo has a highly photographically-trained sales staff and offers free technical support.

Unique Photo runs a photography education program called Unique University. Unique University offers a full curriculum of seminars and classes which range from beginner to expert and are run daily.

Unique University

Unique University's technical classes include such topics as basic D-SLR photography, D-SLR video, lighting techniques, Adobe Photoshop, Elements and Lightroom, composition, editing and printing, wedding photography, HDR photography, and working with speedlites. Unique University also offers one-on-one personalized instruction. Famous speakers and photographers have included Lindsay Adler, Will Crockett, Rick Sammon, Tyler Stableford, Art Wolfe, Erin Manning, and Michael Yamashita.

Film

In March 2009, it was mentioned that Unique Photo is the largest film supplier in the United States. On March 30, 2009, Unique Photo announced that it had received the very last shipment of Polaroid film ever made.

Recognition

Unique Photo was awarded the "2013 Dealer of the Year" by Digital Imaging Reporter.

In November of 2018, Unique Photo was named a finalist in the 2018 Family Business of the Year by the Rothman Institute of Entrepreneurship at Fairleigh Dickinson University.

In the News

Unique Photo helped the Fairfield Police Department arrest a credit card fraud suspect in March 2021.

Lawsuits
Argued October 31, 1966. Decided January 23, 1967. -- Hoboken Camera Center, Inc. v. Hartford Accident & Indemnity Co., 93 N.J. Super. 484, 484 (N.J. Super. Ct. App. Div. 1967)  

On September 17, 2013, Unique Photo filed a lawsuit on Unique Photo Deals USA, LLC. This was done because Unique Photo Deals USA agreed to cease using the similar name in February 2013, including operating on Amazon and surrendering UniquePhotoDealsUSA.com to Unique Photo, Inc., but still continued using the name elsewhere.

References

Photography companies of the United States